Erste Bank a.d. Novi Sad is a bank headquartered in Novi Sad, Serbia.

History
The bank was founded in 1864 as Novosadska banka. In August 2005, Austrian Erste Bank took over the bank's majority share (83.3%) from the Serbian government for €73.2 million. By May 2006, Erste Bank had close to 100% ownership share in the bank, that later that year officially changed its name to "Erste Bank Novi Sad".

See also
 List of banks in Serbia

References

External links
 

2005 mergers and acquisitions
Banks established in 1864
Banks of Serbia
Companies based in Novi Sad